The 2023 HFX Wanderers FC season is the fifth season in the history of HFX Wanderers FC. In addition to the Canadian Premier League, the club will compete in the Canadian Championship.

This will be the club's first season led by Patrice Gheisar, who was announced as the club's new head coach on November 30, 2022.

Current squad

Transfers

In

Draft picks 
HFX Wanderers selected the following players in the 2023 CPL–U Sports Draft. Draft picks are not automatically signed to the team roster. Only those who are signed to a contract will be listed as transfers in.

Out

Loans out

References

External links 
Official Site

2023
2023 Canadian Premier League
Canadian soccer clubs 2023 season
2023 in Nova Scotia